Oraukwu is a town in Anambra State, Nigeria. It used to be called Ohaukwu. It is among the towns in Idemili North Local Government Area of Anambra State, and lies approximately 40 kilometers east of Onitsha along the old Enugu–Onitsha trunk road.  It is around 20 km southwest of local government center Awka. Oraukwu residents include indigenes and settlers from different parts of the country. The indigenes consists of highly educated people and very affluent non-educated traders who are international business merchants. The affairs of the town are run by a state government certified traditional ruler and his cabinet members as well as a town union executives and members who are duly elected in accordance with the town's constitution. Oraukwu has very many notable personalities who have excelled in various spheres of life such as in Academics, Trade and investments, industrialization etc. They are well known for human capital development as well as very many visible infrastructural developments which are self sponsored by the indigenes.

References

Oraukwu, Nigeria Page, Falling Rain.com.
Oraukwu, Anambra, Nigeria, travelingluck.com.
Anambra State, nigeriagalleria.com.

Towns in Anambra State